Paul Abbott (born 1960) is an English television scriptwriter.

Paul Abbott may also refer to:

 Paul Abbott (baseball) (born 1967), American professional baseball player
 Paul Abbott (footballer) (born 1964), Australian rules footballer
Paul Abbott (basketball), American basketball coach